Victor Indrizzo (born September 23, 1967) is an American session musician, primarily known for playing the drums, as well as a songwriter and producer.

Indrizzo was born in Freeport, Long Island, New York. He has toured, recorded and worked with a variety of artists, including Samiam, A'Me Lorain (to whom he was married), Scott Weiland, Chris Cornell, Queens of the Stone Age, Beck, Macy Gray, Daniel Lanois, Lizzo, Willie Nelson, Avril Lavigne, Dave Gahan (and Depeche Mode), Gwen Stefani, Gnarls Barkley, Redd Kross, The Vines and others. Most recently he has collaborated with Seal, Colbie Caillat, Brandon Flowers, Daniel Powter, Café Tacuba, Juanes, Alanis Morissette, Elisa, Tegan and Sara,  He is currently on tour with Alanis Morissette .

Indrizzo has also worked on the soundtracks to many movies, including 40 Year Old Virgin, Get Him to the Greek, Horrible Bosses, Crazy, Stupid, Love, Diary of a Wimpy Kid, Get Well Soon, Spider-Man, Charlie's Angels, Superbad, and The Matrix Reloaded.
https://jaxsta.com/one-sheet/victorindrizzo

Partial list of projects

Collaborations 
 Euphoria Morning – Chris Cornell (1999)
 Poses – Rufus Wainwright (2001)
 The Id – Macy Gray (2001)
 Let Go – Avril Lavigne (2002)
 Paper Monsters – Dave Gahan (2003)
 The Trouble with Being Myself – Macy Gray (2003)
 Mi Sangre – Juanes (2004)
 Fijación Oral, Vol. 1 – Shakira (2005)
 The Forgotten Arm – Aimee Mann (2005)
 Oral Fixation, Vol. 2 – Shakira (2005)
 La Vida... Es Un Ratico – Juanes (2007)
 Big – Macy Gray (2007)
 Under the Radar – Daniel Powter (2008)
 Give Up the Ghost – Brandi Carlile (2009)
 Cradlesong – Rob Thomas (2009)
 Flamingo – Brandon Flowers (2010)
 100 Miles from Memphis – Sheryl Crow (2010)
 P.A.R.C.E. – Juanes (2010)
 Kaleidoscope Heart – Sara Bareilles (2010)
 Ms. Vocalist – Debbie Gibson (2010)
 Fearless Love – Melissa Etheridge (2010)
 Soul 2 – Seal (2011)
 Havoc and Bright Lights – Alanis Morissette (2012)
 Turn On the Lights – Daniel Powter (2012)
 Child of the Universe – Delta Goodrem (2012)
 Resurrection – Anastacia (2014)
 The Way – Macy Gray (2014)
 The Great Unknown – Rob Thomas (2015)
 Something Worth Saving – Gavin DeGraw (2016)
 The Medicine Show – Melissa Etheridge (2019)

References

External links
2014 Audio Interview with Victor Indrizzo from the Podcast 'I'd Hit That'
Victor Indrizzo at CD Universe

1967 births
Living people
People from Freeport, New York
20th-century American drummers
American male drummers
20th-century American male musicians
Samiam members